Thattathin Marayathu is a 2012 Indian Malayalam-language romantic comedy film written and directed by Vineeth Sreenivasan, starring Nivin Pauly and Isha Talwar. The supporting cast includes Aju Varghese, Manoj K. Jayan, Sunny Wayne, Sreeram Ramachandran, Bhagath Manuel, Manikuttan, Sreenivasan, and Niveda Thomas. The film was produced by actors Mukesh and Sreenivasan. The film is about a Hindu boy, Vinod, and a Muslim girl, Aisha, and the conflict arising out of this inter-faith relationship.

The film has been considered as one of the defining movies of the Malayalam New Wave. The movie was remade in Telugu as Saheba Subramanyam and in Tamil as Meendum Oru Kadhal Kadhai.

Plot

The story starts with a flashback in which two school boys, Vinod Nair and his friend, are at the Thalassery pier. Vinod Nair sees a Muslim girl who he finds attractive and he prays to God to make her his wife in the future.

Then movie shifts focus to the present, in which Vinod, hailing from a middle-class Hindu Nair family, is jailed for trespassing the property of a rich Muslim politician, Abdul Khader. Realizing that he went there to meet the Muslim girl, Aisha, the politician's niece with whom he's madly in love, Sub-inspector Prem Kumar and his men request him to tell his love story.

From here, the movie goes back in time by a few months, when Vinod first saw Aisha while attending his friend's marriage. He accidentally collides with her while running along a corridor and she falls down a staircase, ending up unconscious in a hospital. Vinod goes to the hospital and finds a little girl beside Aisha's bed. With her help, he leaves a 'sorry' letter to Aisha, written using a stencil. Then with his close friends Abdu and Mustafa, Vinod tries to win Aisha's heart.

To get a chance to talk to Aisha, Vinod next tries to participate in a Daffmuttu competition in Kannur University Cultural Festival in which Aisha also is participating. 
He goes to a trainer Najaf. But Vinod and Najaf have a history of bitterness when during his 12th grade senior year, the duo had a tiff. The storyline goes into further flashback mode, to a few years prior.

Vinod along with his friends back then, Nijad and Majid had a gang, named Smartboyz. Majid was in love with Fatima, the daughter of the local shrimp merchant. But Fatima was in love with Najaf. Thus the trio decides to take on Najaf and beat him by covering faces. After beating Najaf, in an act of heroism, Majid accidentally threw away his driving license along with some money. The driving license gives his credentials away, and the next day all three are beaten up by Najaf's friends.

Despite this history, Najaf who is now married to his new lover Khadeeja accepts to teach him Daffmuttu. During the cultural festival, Vinod meets Aisha and wishes her a happy birthday. He is won over by her radiance and decides to confront her. After the festival is over, Vinod goes to Aisha's house late at night and confesses his feelings. There is no reply from Aisha, but after a few days, Aisha reciprocates his feelings by writing a letter. Then one night, when he believes that no one is at her home, he tries to meet her. Only to be caught and sent to police custody. With this Vinod winds up his story.

Listening to this with full attention, S.I Premkumar lends his full support to Vinod and promises to help him unite with Aisha. Vinod tries to find a way of reaching out to Aisha by exchanging letters with her. He finds Hamza, Aisha's tutor and cousin, a friend of Abdu. Hamza is in love with Vinod's sister and he agrees to help Vinod. To make money Vinod opens a Purdah shop with the help of Sub-inspector Premkumar and asks Aisha to inaugurate the shop. She agrees to come on Friday afternoon when she's alone in her house. Aisha inaugurates the shop and meets Vinod's parents. While returning, they are blocked by some men who are enraged to see Aisha in the car with two men. After reaching home, Aisha is put into house-arrest by her father's elder brother, Abdul Khader. An accident happens in Khader's factory, which leads to a communal riot leading to which Aisha's father Abdul Rahman gets attacked. While in hospital, Khader informs his brother that they are shifting to Trivandrum the next day to prevent any untoward incidents further. Abdul Rahman agrees and Aisha sees Vinod one last time in the night. The next day, Abdul Rahman realises that he should allow Aisha to live with the one she loves. Khader departs and Aisha calls Vinod but finds that Vinod's phone is switched off and he is nowhere to be seen.

Finally, with the help of SI Premkumar, they find him in sitting by the sea bridge and Aisha proposes him to marry her. Vinod asks to kiss her which she agrees. The scene shifts back to the first scene at the same sea-bridge where Vinod prays to God to get that beautiful girl he saw and as he leaves, a woman calls out to the little girl as 'Aisha'.

The film ends on the note that "God is quite a person; even if we forget some of our wishes, he never does."

Cast

Production
Thattathin Marayathu is Vineeth Sreenivasan's second directorial venture and was produced by Lumiere Film Company, a production house owned by Vineeth's father Sreenivasan and actor Mukesh and Executive Producer Antony Edakochi. The film began its shooting in April 2012 at Thalassery and Kannur.

Nivin Pauly, Aju Varghese, Bhagath Manuel were cast once again by Vineeth Sreenivasan after their first film, while Isha Talwar was introduced by the cameraman Jomon T. John and was selected. Isha Talwar took a four-month voice training class and went through a course to learn Malayalam to ensure her debut was smooth. Ahmed Siddique was chosen to play a very similar character like the one he played in the film Salt N' Pepper, although the differences are he plays a typical Muslim guy with an impeccable Thalassery accent.

Reception

Critical

Moviebuzz in Sify.com rated the movie "Very Good", saying: "With a cute, simple storyline, which is meant to be enjoyed like of whiff of pure fresh air, the film just keeps you engaged all along, quite effectively." One India.com's Smitha gave a positive review, saying: "If you enjoy reading simple Mills and Boons kind of romantic love stories, you might just like Thattathin Marayathu." Similarly, Indiaglitz.com also mentioned that the film is "advised for all who enjoyed reading Mills and Boons kind of romantic love stories, at some point of your adolescence", rating the movie 6/10. The Times of India rated the movie 3.5 out of 5 stars, saying "Vineeth has crafted his dialogues with a highly laughable sense of humour".

However, Veeyen of Nowrunning.com rated the movie 2.5 out of 5 stars. saying: "Performances of the lead actors often come to the rescue, even as the script holds few surprises." Rediff.com's Malayalam movie reviewer Paresh C Palicha also gave a negative review, rating the movie 2 stars out of 5. "The screenplay does try to be interesting going back and forth in the first half, and even has cheeky humour punctuating the proceedings. But, after a while, it feels as if the story is stuck in 'no man's land', not knowing whether to adopt a serious tone or go with the humorous flow," he said.

Box office
Thattathin Marayathu created a new city record in Ernakulam where it netted  62 lakhs from Padma, Sridhar and two multiplexes. A distributor's share of approximately  34.2 lakhs in three weeks. In Thiruvananthapuram, which has the lowest ticket rates among cities in Kerala, the film has taken a distributor's share of  19.5 lakhs in 21 days. The film completed 50 days in 28 centres at the Kerala box office. The film collected  1.66 lakhs in the 1st weekend and  7.73 lakhs in the 9th weekend (final run) from US box office. The film collected  16.24 lakhs from 13th weekend (final run) from UK box office. The movie was second biggest grosser of 2012 and collected over ₹18.9 crore at the box office.

Soundtrack

The film's score and soundtrack were composed by Shaan Rahman. The lyrics for the soundtrack album featuring ten tracks in total, were written by Anu Elizabeth Jose, Engandiyur Chandrasekharan, and Vineeth Sreenivasan. The audio soundtrack was published by Mathrubhumi Music on 8 June 2012, at the film's audio release event held at Kochi. Actors Mammootty, Dulquer Salmaan, Kunchacko Boban and Fahadh Faasil and the actors of the film released the audio by handing over the CD to M. V. Shreyas Kumar, the managing director of Mathrubhumi company. The soundtrack album received positive reviews with the song "Muthuchippi". By late July 2012, the song had received more than six lakh hits on YouTube.

Remakes 
Thattathin Marayathu was remade into Tamil and Telugu languages. It was first remade in Telugu as Saheba Subramanyam in 2014 starring Priyal Gor and Dileep Kumar. In 2015 a Tamil remake was also made with the title Meendum Oru Kadhal Kadhai by Mithran Jawahar starring Walter Philips and Isha Talwar.

Accolades

References

External links
 

2010s Malayalam-language films
Films scored by Shaan Rahman
Indian romantic drama films
Indian interfaith romance films
2012 romantic drama films
2012 films
Malayalam films remade in other languages
Films directed by Vineeth Sreenivasan
Films shot in Thalassery
Films shot in Kannur